Mishkin (Russian: Мишкин) is a Russian masculine surname, its feminine counterpart is Mishkina. It is derived from the masculine given name Mishka, a diminutive form of Mikhail. It may refer to the following people:
 Lawrence Mishkin, Sales & Marketing expert
 Alexander Mishkin, Russian military doctor
 Andrew Mishkin (born 1958), American Jet Propulsion Laboratory engineer who worked on the Mars Rover
 Dan Mishkin (born 1953), American comic book writer
 Frederic Mishkin (born 1951), American economist and member of the US Federal Reserve
 Herman Mishkin (1870–1948), Russian-American photographer
 Lee Mishkin (1927–2001), American animator and director
 Leo Mishkin (1907–1980), American film, theater, and television critic
 Meyer Mishkin (1912–1999), Hollywood agent
 Mírzá Mishkín-Qalam (1826–1912), Persian calligrapher 
 Mortimer Mishkin (1926–2021), American neuropsychologist

Fictional characters
 Dmitri Mishkin, character in the James Bond film GoldenEye

See also
 Myshkin (surname), a similar Russian surname
Miskin, a Welsh village

References

Russian-language surnames